The Song of the Soul is a lost 1918 silent film drama directed by Tom Terriss and starring Alice Joyce. It was produced by the Vitagraph Company of America and distributed by V-L-S-E.

Cast
Alice Joyce – Ann Fenton
Percy Standing – Fenton
Walter McGrail – Dr. Evans
Bernard Randall – Butch
Bernard Siegel – Oelsen
Edith Reeves – Ruth
Stephen Carr – Billy Fenton

References

External links

1918 films
Lost American films
Films directed by Tom Terriss
Vitagraph Studios films
American black-and-white films
American silent feature films
Silent American drama films
1918 drama films
1918 lost films
Lost drama films
1910s American films
1910s English-language films